Synhamitermes colombensis, is a species of termite of the genus Synhamitermes. It is point endemic to Colombo region of Sri Lanka.

References

Termites
Insects described in 1913